NA-154 Lodhran-I is a constituency for the National Assembly of Pakistan.

Election 2002 

General elections were held on 10 Oct 2002. Muhammad Akhtar Khan Kanju of PML-Q won by 103,209 votes.

Election 2008 

General elections were held on 18 Feb 2008. Hayatullah Khan Tareen of PPP won by 50,490 votes.

Election 2013 

General elections were held on 11 May 2013. Abdul Rehman Khan Kanju of PML-N won by 85,452 votes and became the  member of National Assembly.

Election 2018

See also
NA-153 Multan-VI
NA-155 Lodhran-II

References

External links 
Election result's official website

NA-155